Mister Cool, Mr. Cool, or Mr Cool may refer to:

Nicknames and pseudonyms 
 Mister Cool, nickname for Ibrahim El Bouni, an MMA fighter; see List of current ONE fighters
 Mister Cool, nickname for Sam Farha, professional poker player
 Mr. Cool, nickname for Elwood Glover, Canadian broadcaster and musician
 Mister Cool, nickname for Randy Herdian, a contestant on I Can See Your Voice Indonesia (season 3)
 Mr. Cool, stage name for Jason Koenig, member of the band Kentucky Knife Fight
 Mr. Cool, stage name for Antero Manninen, musician
 Mr. Cool, nickname for Jimmy Mariano, Filipino basketball player
 Mr. Cool, nickname for Shukor Salleh, Malaysian footballer

Animals
 Mister Cool, a medal-winning horse in equestrian for Ireland at the 2012 Summer Paralympics.
 Mr Cool, a race-winning racehorse sired by Jupiter Island

Characters
 Mr. Cool (Mr. Men), a character from the children's literature series Mr. Men
 Mr. Cool, a character from the 1958 UK novel Absolute Beginners
 Mr Cool, a character from the 1986 British film Absolute Beginners
 Mr. Cool, an anthropomorphic dog from the animated TV show The Fonz and the Happy Days Gang
 Mr. Cool, a guest character from the animated TV show Wow! Wow! Wubbzy!
 Mr. Cool, a nickname for Kwamé Asiedu, a character in the 2000s British TV show Rock School
 Mr. Cool, a nickname for Lawrence, a character in the 2003 U.S. film School of Rock
 Mr Cool, a character from the 2016 Hong Kong film Buddy Cops
 Mr. Cool, a 2010s advertising character used by e-cigarette maker blu; see Electronic cigarette and e-cigarette liquid marketing

Music

Albums
 Mr. Cool, alternative title for Still Crazy, a 1981 album by Crazy Cavan 'n' the Rhythm Rockers
 Mr.Cool, a 2003 album by Louis Koo

Songs
 "Mr. Cool" (Kevin Ayers song), 1977
 "Mr. Cool", a 1963 song by The Champs
 "Mr Cool", a 1975 song by Sweet Sensation
 "Mr Cool", a 1970s single by Killer Kane and Blackie Lawless
 "Mr. Cool", a 1981 song by Carroll Thompson, from the album Hopelessly in Love
 "Mr. Cool", a 1984 song by Vixen, from the Hardbodies soundtrack
 "Mr. Cool", a song by Sykotik Sinfoney, from the Bad Channels soundtrack
 "Mr. Cool", a 1996 song by Eg White, from the album Turn Me On, I'm a Rocket Man
 "Mr. Cool", a 1997 song by Ill Gotten Gains, found on the 2003 compilation album Grand Central Vol. 2
 "Mister Cool", a 2004 song by Snook, from the album Vi vet inte vart vi ska men vi ska komma dit
 "Mr. Cool", a 2004 song by Tamia featuring Mario Winans, from the album More
 "Mr. Cool", a 2006 song by Jim Jones, from the album 'Hustler's P.O.M.E. (Product of My Environment)Other uses
 Mr. Cool (book), by Roger Hargreaves and illustrated by Adam Hargreaves, part of the Mr. Men series, 2003
 Mr. Cool (video game), 1983
 Mr Cool, a short film collected in the 1999 film anthology Tube Tales''
 "Mr. Cool", an episode of the television show Silver Spoons
 "Mr. Cool", an episode of the television show Pawn Stars

See also

 Mister (disambiguation)
 Cool (disambiguation)
 Cool (surname)
 Kool (surname)
 MR (disambiguation)
 Evaporative cooler, or mister